Cheers was a proa sailboat designed by Dick Newick in 1967. It was one of the earliest designs in his career, which contributed substantially to the revival of multihull vessels from the 1960s to the late 20th century. Like a traditional proa, Cheers had no bow or stern and could sail in either direction.

Race win
In 1968 Newick entered Cheers in the quadrennial Observer Single-Handed Trans-Atlantic Race (Ostar), an open class solo trans-Atlantic race from Plymouth, England, to Newport, Rhode Island, sponsored by The Observer. Cheers finished third, beating much larger conventional boats under skipper Tom Follett who became the first American to have finished the race.

Legacy
Cheers is now owned by a French couple, who restored it. France declared the boat a historical monument.

See also
Proa
Trice (trimaran), an earlier vessel designed by Newick shortly before Cheers
Dick Newick

References

1960s sailing yachts